Lucifer's Friend was a German rock band, formed in Hamburg in 1970 by guitarist Peter Hesslein, singer John Lawton, bassist Dieter Horns, keyboardist Peter Hecht, and drummer Joachim Reitenbach. The group was an early practitioner of heavy metal and progressive rock; they also incorporated elements of jazz and fusion into their music, especially in their fourth album Banquet of 1974. Beyond heavy metal, the band has been cited, too, as one of the pioneers of doom metal, helping to define both genres due to their heavy sound and dark oriented lyrics of their debut Lucifer's Friend of 1970, and returning to their roots in 1981 with Mean Machine, although more influenced by speed metal.

History 
Vocalist John Lawton's band Stonewall broke up while on tour in West Germany in 1969. While the band returned home to Britain, Lawton elected to stay in Germany for the time being, and there he met Peter Hesslein, Dieter Horns, Peter Hecht and Joachim Reitenbach, all members of a band called The German Bonds. The five joined together to record an album under the band name Asterix in 1970, soon changing their name to Lucifer's Friend.

The early albums were released on the Vertigo Records label in Europe, but in the United States those albums were released on a series of small independent record labels (Billingsgate, Janus, Passport), often a year or more after their release in Europe.  Thus, despite airplay in some markets and a cult following, the band's albums were hard to find and commercial success eluded them.  The band was finally signed to Elektra Records in 1977: it released three albums with a more commercial pop oriented sound, but by then interest in the band had waned; those albums were even less successful than the earlier ones.

Lucifer's Friend was known for changing musical styles and influences on each album.  The self-titled 1970 debut had dark lyrics and a stripped-down guitar and organ style and sounded similar to Deep Purple, Uriah Heep, Led Zeppelin and Black Sabbath .  That album is still sought after by fans of early heavy metal music.

The second album, Where the Groupies Killed the Blues (1972), took an entirely different direction. It was a very experimental album of progressive and psychedelic rock, mostly composed by John O'Brien Docker.  On the third album, I'm Just a Rock & Roll Singer (1973), they changed direction again, this time in the straightforward rock style popularized by such groups as Grand Funk Railroad, and gritty "life on the road" themes in the lyrics.

Banquet (1974) featured extended, multi-layered jazz fusion compositions and a 30-piece backup band, alternating with some shorter tracks reminiscent of Chicago and Traffic.  Those first four albums are all concept albums of a sort and along with the self-titled Asterix album are the most sought after today.

Mind Exploding (1976) established a holding pattern and tried to combine the jazz of Banquet with the garage-rock of Rock & Roll Singer, but was not as well received as the earlier albums.  Vocalist John Lawton left in 1976 to join Uriah Heep. He was replaced by Mike Starrs. With him the band recorded and released 7" single "Old Man Roller / Writing On The Wall" in June 1977. John Lawton returned for the 1981 album Mean Machine.  On the two albums without Lawton the band moved to a more commercial sound, on 1978's Good Time Warrior and 1980s Sneak Me In.

John Lawton's 1980 solo album on RCA, Heartbeat, was a Lucifer's Friend album in everything but name, with the lineup from Sneak Me In performing as backup musicians on that project.  Lawton's official return, Mean Machine, found the band returning to heavy metal, this time in the vein of Rainbow and NWOBHM.  The band officially broke up in 1982 but thirteen years later, in 1994 John and Peter Hesslein briefly reformed to release a new CD, Sumo Grip under the name of Lucifer's Friend II, with Curt Cress, Andreas Dicke, Jogi Wichmann and Udo Dahmen replacing the classic line-up. After this they broke up once more.

Recent years 
Although John Lawton stated that the crew weren't interested in getting back to record or perform live again, in August 2014 he announced on his website that the original lineup would reunite to play some dates in 2015, including Sweden Rock Festival in June, after almost 40 years since their last gig together. They then released a new compilation album called Awakening, followed by four new tracks. Due to the demise of their original drummer Joachim "Addi" Rietenbach a few years ago, his position was now occupied by Stephan Eggert. Also, original keyboardist Peter Hecht refused to participate in the reunion. Due to this, guitarist Peter Hesslein played the keyboard parts on the new album, once again hiring Jogi Wichmann (who played on Sumo Grip) as the live keyboardist for the shows in 2015 and 2016.

Lucifer’s Friend released two further albums, Too Late To Hate in 2016 and Black Moon in 2019. Bassist Dieter Horns passed away in December 2020, followed by lead singer John Lawton passing away in June 2021, effectively ending the band.

The Lucifer's Friend song "Ride in the Sky" is played in the Bulgarian film Love.net, starring Lawton, as a song by a fictional band called Tabloid.

Legacy 
Tim Baker, lead singer of the doom metal band Cirith Ungol, cited Lucifer's Friend as an influence on Cirith Ungol's sound in an interview with Metal Forces, stating that "We really wanted to be like [Lucifer's Friend]".

Members 
John Lawton – vocals (1970–1976, 1981–1982, 2014–2020; died 2021)
Mike Starrs – vocals (1977–1981)
Peter Hesslein – guitar (1970–1982, 2014–2020)
Dieter Horns – bass (1970–1982, 2014–2020; died 2020)
Joachim "Addi" Rietenbach – drums (1970–1974; died 1974)
Herbert Bornhold – drums (1974–1982)
Stephan Eggert – drums (2014–2020)
Peter Hecht – keyboards (1970–1982)
Jogi Wichmann – keyboards (2014–2020)

Timeline

Discography

Studio albums 
 Asterix (1970; as Asterix)
 Lucifer's Friend (1970)
 Where the Groupies Killed the Blues (1972)
 I'm Just a Rock 'n' Roll Singer (1973)
 Banquet (1974)
 Mind Exploding (1976)
 Good Time Warrior (1978)
 Sneak Me In (1980)
 Mean Machine (1981)
 Sumogrip (1994; as Lucifer's Friend II)
 Too Late To Hate (2016)
 Black Moon (2019)

Compilation & live albums 
 The Devil's Touch (1976) (1970–1976 Compilation)
 Rock Heavies: Lucifer's Friend (1980) (1970–1976 Compilation)
 Awakening (2015) (Compilation + new songs)
 Live @ Sweden Rock 2015 (2016)

Side projects and related bands 

German Bonds (Includes Peter Hecht on keyboards and Dieter Horns on bass)

 Sonata Facile b/w So Mystifying (1965)
 We are Out of Sight b/w Sing Hallelujah (1966)
 Skinny Eleonore b/w Birthday is Today (1969)

Bokaj Retsiem (Includes Peter Hecht on keyboards, Dieter Horns on bass and Joachim Rietenbach on drums)
 Psychedelic Underground (1968)

Hell Preachers Inc. (Includes future Lucifer's Friend members Peter Hecht on keyboards, Dieter Horns on bass and Joachim Rietenbach on drums, guitar played by Rainer Degner and vocals by George Mavros)
 Supreme Psychedelic Underground (1968)

Brother T & Family (Includes future Lucifer's Friend members, except John Lawton)
 Drillin' of the Rock (1970)

Electric Food (singer George Mavros backed by Lucifer's Friend members, without John Lawton)
 Electric Food (Electric Food album, 1970)
 Flash (Electric Food album, 1970)

Asterix
 "Everybody"' (single, lead vocals George Mavros, pre-John Lawton)
 Asterix (album, 1970, includes all future Lucifer's Friend members, plus Toni Cavanagh)

Pink Mice (Includes all original Lucifer's Friend members, except John Lawton)
 In Action (1971)
 In Synthesized Sound (1971)

Hepp, Hahn and Huhn (Includes Peter Hecht on keyboards and Dieter Horns on bass)
 Alive and Goodnight (1971)

Okko Becker (Includes Peter Hesslein on guitars)
 Sitar and Electronics (1971)

Propeller (Includes Peter Hesslein on guitars)
 Let Us Live Together (1971)

Frankie Dymon (Includes Peter Hecht on keyboards)
 Let it Out (1971)

The Rattles (Includes Herbert Bornhold on drums)
 The Witch (1972)

David Frank Selection (Includes Peter Hesslein on guitars)
 Blues & Electronics (1972)

John Lawton (Includes all original Lucifer's Friend members)
 Heartbeat (John Lawton solo album, 1980)

References

General sources 
 Christe, Ian (2003). Sound of the Beast: The Complete Headbanging History of Heavy Metal. HarperCollins.

External links 
 
 

1970 establishments in West Germany
1982 disestablishments in West Germany
German progressive rock groups
German hard rock musical groups
Musical groups from Hamburg
Vertigo Records artists
Musical groups established in 1970
Musical groups disestablished in 1982